Baghalduz-e Olya (also Romanized as Baghaldūz-e ‘Olyā) is a village in Khandan Rural District, Tarom Sofla District, Qazvin County, Qazvin Province, Iran. At the 2006 census, its population was 61, in 20 families.

References 

Populated places in Qazvin County